Mood Rings (alternatively, Moodrings) are an alternative rock band based in Atlanta. Debuting in 2011 with the EP Sweater Weather Forever, they have since been recognised nationally for their sound, which has been called "engaging" by The Guardian, "lush and ethereal" by BrooklynVegan, "dreamy post-punk" by Stereogum, and "lush, neon hued" by Spin Magazine.  Their second single, "Pathos y Lagrimas" was featured in Converse's "Ready, Set: Get Lost" music series. Converse recorded and released a music video for the song on YouTube in October 2012.    They released a limited edition silk-screened 7" of "Pathos y Lagrimas" and "333" for Record Store Day 2013, and performed an instore at Atlanta's Criminal Records. Their first album, VPI Harmony, was released on Mexican Summer on 25 June 2013. Heather Phares of Allmusic praised the album, saying "Held together by its oddly luxurious feel, VPI Harmony blends its many sounds and moods into a remarkable debut." When playing in Loring Park in Minneapolis, MN the band was rumored to play naked, when in fact they wore socks.

William Fussell relocated to London, England, in 2015 and set up a solo-project titled, Promise Keeper. He released his debut EP on May 19, 2017.

Discography

Studio albums

Singles + EPs

References 

Mexican Summer artists
Musical groups from Atlanta